Roberta Evelyn Martin (February 12, 1907 – January 18, 1969) was an American gospel composer, singer, pianist, arranger and choral organizer, helped launch the careers of many other gospel artists through her group, The Roberta Martin Singers.

Early years

Born in Helena, Arkansas, on February 12, 1907, Martin moved to Chicago with her family in 1917, where she studied piano. Although a high school teacher inspired her to dream of becoming a concert pianist, her future course was changed after accompanying the Young People's Choir at Ebenezer Baptist Church. She came into contact with Thomas A. Dorsey, known as the Father of Gospel Music, through her work as the pianist for the youth choir. With Dorsey's help, she and Theodore Frye organized the Martin-Frye Quartet, a youth group consisting of Eugene Smith, Norsalus McKissick, Robert Anderson, James Lawrence, Willie Webb and Romance Watson, in 1933. Martin renamed the group the Roberta Martin Singers in 1936 and added Bessie Folk, Myrtle Scott and Delois Barrett Campbell to the group in the 1940s. The group set the standard for the gospel choir and mixed group, and had an extremely successful recording career, featuring such hits as "Only A Look," and "Grace." Most of these songs were published by Roberta Martin Studio of Music, a publishing house in Chicago that she incorporated in 1939, and would eventually publish outstanding compositions by gospel artists ranging from Professor Alex Bradford to James Cleveland. Her first composition, "Try Jesus, He Satisfies," was an immediate hit in 1943. She was also the choir director of the Pisgah Baptist Church in Chicago for many years.

Musical career

The theme song of the Roberta Martin Singers is "Only A Look." It was always sung at the opening of their concerts, at their annual Anniversary Program in Chicago, and was recorded on the Apollo label with Bessie Folk with Delois Barrett as lead soloists and later on the Savoy label with Delois Barrett as lead vocalist. Martin's group was unique in a number of ways. It was the first to include both male and female voices in a small group format. Martin favored smooth harmonies and a subtle rhythmic dynamic in which her singers were slightly, almost imperceptibly, behind the beat. On slower songs Martin featured lead singers against a subdued background provided by the rest of the group; on jubilee and shout material she used the more energetic call-and-response technique typical of Holiness churches. Martin encouraged her singers to maintain their individual personalities, allowing the audience to distinguish each backup singer's voice rather than blending them into a single choral sound.

Martin complemented her group's performance with her piano accompaniment, which often dictated the rhythm and pace of the song or commented on it by responding to or accenting a singer's performance. Martin's piano style reflected the influence of Holiness artists such as Arizona Dranes and her classical training.

The other musical signature of the Roberta Martin Singers was the accompaniment of "Little" Lucy Smith on the Hammond organ. Her droning introductory chord and unique "passes" using the bass pedals set the tone for a meditative experience and became a recognized  trademark of a "Roberta Martin gospel song".

Martin's refined, subdued style, which emphasized phrasing and modulation,  had a profound influence on many gospel artists, including Albertina Walker, James Cleveland and Alex Bradford.  Cleveland and Bradford wrote and arranged for and performed with her group early in their careers. Her stylistic restraint did not, on the other hand, mean that her group lacked fervor or emotional punch; as one commentator noted, "Bert would sneak up on you and hurt you."

Roberta briefly retired from music in the 60's due in part to her battle with cancer, but came back to record her final album Praise God (from whom all blessings flow), and her vocal recording, "I Have Hope", which was written by her friend Jessie Jimerson (aka Jessie Jimerson-Phillips.)  Her group disbanded upon her death in 1969, but the surviving members continued to perform as a group in reunion concerts into the 21st century.  Many of the members later had solo careers, such as Delois Barrett and Gloria Griffin, who was the composer of the classic gospel song "God Specializes", made famous by the Roberta Martin Singers in concerts and recordings.

Death
Roberta Martin died of cancer on January 18, 1969, at the age of 61.  Well-known and very popular in the African-American community, her funeral in Chicago attracted over 50,000 mourners.

Legacy

She composed about seventy songs, arranged and published 280 gospel songs, and reached and inspired thousands of listeners selling sheet music. Her compositions include "He Knows Just How Much We Can Bear," and "God Is Still on the Throne" (1959), "Let It Be" (1950), and "Just Jesus and Me" (1966). Martin earned six Gold records and the Roberta Martin Singers sang at Gian-Carlo Menotti's Spoleto Festival of Two Worlds in Spoleto, Italy, in 1963. Her great contribution to the history of gospel music was her development of a distinctive gospel-piano style and the special sound of her group, which integrated for the first time men and women into the gospel chorus during the mid-40s when she brought female voices into her all-male group, which she accompanied on piano.

On July 15, 1998, the United States Postal Service issued a 32 cent commemorative stamp honoring Martin's influence. The stamp was one of four honoring gospel women. The other women honored were Mahalia Jackson, Clara Ward, and Sister Rosetta Tharpe.

Footnotes

References

 Tony Heilbut, The Gospel Sound: Good News and Bad Times Limelight Editions (1997), 
 Horace Clarence Boyer, How Sweet the Sound: The Golden Age of Gospel Elliott and Clark (1995) 
 Bernice Johnson Reagon, We'll Understand It Better By And By: Pioneering African-American Gospel Composers Smithsonian Institution (1992), 

American gospel singers
Singers from Arkansas
American women composers
Savoy Records artists
People from Helena, Arkansas
1907 births
1969 deaths
Apollo Records artists
20th-century American composers
20th-century women composers
20th-century African-American women singers